Pustulosis palmaris et plantaris  is a chronic recurrent pustular dermatosis (that is, a pustulosis or pustular psoriasis) localized on the palms and soles only, characterized histologically by intraepidermal pustules filled with neutrophils. It can occur as part of the SAPHO syndrome.

Treatment 
Systematic reviews show evidence to support the use of systemic retinoids alone and in combination with photochemotherapy to improve symptoms of chronic palmoplantar pustulosis, with a combination more effective than one alone. There is also evidence to support topical steroids under hydrocolloid occlusion dressings, low dose ciclosporin, tetracyclines, and Grenz-Ray Therapy. There is no evidence to support the use of hydroxyurea in chronic palmoplantar pustulosis.

Treatment with guselkumab, an anti–interleukin 23 monoclonal antibody has shown a decrease in the size of the area affected and severity.

See also 
 List of cutaneous conditions

References

External links 

Psoriasis
Recalcitrant palmoplantar eruptions